Raghavambalpuram (Sadayarkoil) is a village in the Orathanadu taluk of Thanjavur district, Tamil Nadu, India.

Demographics 

As per the 2001 census, Raghavambalpuram (Sadayarkoil) had a total population of 1627 with 843 males and 824 females. The sex ratio was 930. The literacy rate was 63.86.

References 

 

Villages in Thanjavur district